Venkata In Sankata is a 2009 Kannada comedy film directed by Ramesh Aravind and produced by "Sinema House" banner. The story is written by Telugu film writer, Madhu Thotapalli. This is the fourth directorial venture of actor Ramesh.

Besides Ramesh playing the titular role of a traffic cop, the film cast includes Sharmiela Mandre, Anusha, Meghana Mudiyan, Tulu theatre artist Devadas Kapikad, H. G. Dattatreya, Mukhyamantri Chandru, Umashree Umesh and rajinikant Upadhye among others. The film made its theatrical release on 20 February 2009 and received favorable reviews from the critics.

Plot 
The film is all about a traffic constable Venkata (Ramesh) who dreams big to become a commissioner. Situations provoke him to become a target for all the troubles that happen around him. Later he is sent as an undercover cop to a college. His duty is to bust the terrorist who are stealing the chemicals from that college to prepare bombs. How he comes out of the trouble and reaches his aim forms the rest of the plot told in a hilarious manner.

Cast 
 Ramesh Aravind as Venkata
 Devadas Kapikad as Rajaram Laddoo
 Sharmiela Mandre 
 Meghana Mudiyam
 Anusha
 M. S. Umesh as "Gundamma"
 Mukhyamantri Chandru
 H. G. Dattatreya
 Rajendra Karanth as Iqbal
 Umashree
 Bank Janardhan
 Karibasavaiah
 Kashi
 Dingri Nagaraj
 rajinikant s as punga

Soundtrack 

The music was composed by Ricky Kej for Anand Audio company. The audio was launched and released to the market on 20 January 2009.

Review 
Upon release, the film met with positive critical reviews for its comical content and character portrayals. Times Of India reviewed with 4 stars lauding the film to be a "brilliant family entertainer with an excellent script, neat narration and slick placement of sequences". Rediff.com reviewed that the film is "worth a watch" giving it a 3.5 star rating.Bangalore Mirror wrote "Then there are the made-to-make you-laugh characters like the gluttonous old woman played by Umesh, a fake godman, a group of naughty students and fumbling lecturers who in perfect sync with the story. The highlights of the film are the quirky dialogues and the swift narrative."

References

External links 

 First Look: Ramesh Arvind and his three beauties

2009 films
2000s Kannada-language films
Indian comedy films
2009 comedy films
Films directed by Ramesh Aravind